Gananath Pradhan (7 December 1924 – 14 October 2004) was an Indian politician, belonging to the Janata Party. He was elected to the Lok Sabha the lower house of Indian Parliament from Sambalpur in Odisha. He died in October 2004 at the age of 79.

References

External links
Profile on Lok Sabha website

1924 births
2004 deaths
India MPs 1977–1979
Odisha politicians
Lok Sabha members from Odisha
Utkal Congress politicians
Janata Party politicians
Samata Party politicians
Janata Dal politicians
Bharatiya Lok Dal politicians